Lewis William Wyatt (1777–1853) was a  British architect, a nephew of both Samuel and James Wyatt of the Wyatt family of architects, who articled with each of his uncles and began practice on his own about 1805.

Lewis Wyatt is known primarily for the English country houses he designed, which include Grade II* Cuerden Hall near Preston in 1816–1819, restoring and altering Lyme Park and Heaton Park. Between 1795 and 1800 he partially rebuilt Wythenshawe Hall.

References

19th-century English architects
1777 births
1853 deaths
Lewis